Samuel Smith Kilburn (18311903) was an engraver in Boston, Massachusetts, in the 19th century. He trained with Abel Bowen. Kilburn's work appeared in popular periodicals such as Gleason's Pictorial. His business partners included Richard P. Mallory (Kilburn & Mallory) and Henry C. Cross. For many years Kilburn worked at 96 Washington Street in Boston (1852-1871); he lived in Newton, Massachusetts. Examples of his work are in the collections of the Boston Athenaeum and the Museum of Fine Arts Boston.

Image gallery

Further reading

Works by Kilburn
 S.S. Kilburn. Specimens of designing and engraving on wood. Boston: ca.1865-1867.

Works with engraving by Kilburn
 My teacher's gem. Boston: Lee & Shepard, 1863
 Oliver Optic's Magazine
 Our Young Folks

Works about Kilburn
 New England historical and genealogical register. 1904.

References

External links

 
 
 Not Against Type, blog by Larry Thompson. Image of Thompson's 2009 impression of Kilburn's change of address woodblock. Nov. 25, 2009.
 New York Public Library. Items related to Kilburn.

American engravers
1831 births
1903 deaths
19th century in Boston
Artists from Boston